Shevy may refer to:

Chevrolet, which has been nicknamed "Chevy"
Shuy (disambiguation)